Rolling bridge may be applied to several distinct types of movable bridge:

 Guthrie rolling bridge, a type of retractable bridge, also known as a thrust bridge
 Rolling bascule bridge, a type of bascule bridge (sometimes referred to as a drawbridge)
 The Rolling Bridge, the only bridge of the curling type